Viktoriia Nikolayevna Safonova (born 18 April 1988) is a Ukrainian-Russian female para table tennis player competing at singles (class 7) and team events (class 6–8). She represented Ukraine at the 2008 and 2012 Summer Paralympics, winning bronze in the latter. She represented Russia at 2020 Summer Paralympics where she won a silver medal, having lost to Kelly van Zon in the women's class 7 final.

References

External links

1988 births
Living people
Sportspeople from Simferopol
Paralympic table tennis players of Russia
Paralympic table tennis players of Ukraine
Russian female table tennis players
Ukrainian female table tennis players
Medalists at the 2012 Summer Paralympics
Medalists at the 2020 Summer Paralympics
Paralympic silver medalists for the Russian Paralympic Committee athletes
Paralympic bronze medalists for Ukraine
Paralympic medalists in table tennis
Table tennis players at the 2008 Summer Paralympics
Table tennis players at the 2012 Summer Paralympics
Table tennis players at the 2020 Summer Paralympics
Paralympic bronze medalists for the Russian Paralympic Committee athletes